The Gozo Party was a political party in Malta.

History
The party was established in founded in April 1947 by Francesco Masini. In the October 1947 general elections it contested the 8th District, which covered Gozo, nominating seven candidates. Of the five seats in the district, it won three of them, with Anton Calleja, Guzeppi Cefai and Masini elected to represent the party. However, it did not contest any further elections.

Ideology
The party sought to gain better representation and more financial resources for Gozo.

References

Defunct political parties in Malta
Political parties established in 1947
Gozo
Regionalist parties
1947 establishments in Malta